Robert Orr may refer to:

 Bob Orr (bookseller) (born 1950), co-founder of Lavender Menace Bookshop in Edinburgh, Scotland
 Bobby Orr (born 1948), Canadian hockey player
 Bobby Orr (drummer) (1928-2020), jazz drummer
 Rob Orr (politician) (born 1955), Texas politician
 Robert Orr (executive) (1953–2021), American businessman in Japan, President of Boeing Japan, Vice President of Motorola
 Robert Orr (footballer) (1891–1948), Scottish footballer
 Robert Orr Jr. (1786–1876), American politician, U.S. Representative from Pennsylvania
 Robert C. Orr, UN Assistant Secretary-General for Policy Coordination and Strategic Planning
 Robert D. Orr (1917–2004), American politician, Governor of Indiana
 Bust of Robert D. Orr
 Robert F. Orr (born 1946), American lawyer and judge
 Robert T. Orr (1908–1994), American biologist
 Robert Kemsley Orr, known as Robin Orr, Scottish composer
 July Jones, American actor whose birth name was Robert Orr